Mariella Rappold is an Austrian football midfielder currently playing for LUV Graz in the ÖFB-Frauenliga. She is a member of the Austrian national team.

References

1987 births
Living people
Austrian women's footballers
Women's association football midfielders
ÖFB-Frauenliga players
DFC LUV Graz players